Lake Steinhude, is a lake in Lower Saxony, Germany located  northwest of Hanover. It lies within a region known as the Hanoverian Moor Geest.

Geology
It is part of the glacial landscape formed after the recession of the glaciers of the latest Ice Age, the Weichselian glaciation. There are two theories regarding how the lake of Steinhude was formed.
One of them says that glaciers gouged out the hole and meltwater filled it. The other theory states that an ice storm formed the hole and as the groundwater rose, the lake was created. In its middle there is a small artificial island carrying an 18th-century fortification, the Wilhelmstein. Today the lake is the heart of a nature reserve, the Steinhuder Meer Nature Park, and is also used as a recreational area.

Islands
The lake has two islands, both of them artificial:
 Wilhelmstein off Hagenburg was built between 1761 and 1765. It was turned into a military fortress between 1765 and 1767 by William, Count of Schaumburg-Lippe. Afterwards it briefly served as military school (one of its graduates was Gerhard von Scharnhorst who later became Chief of the Prussian General Staff). From 1777 until 1867 the island was used as state prison of the Principality of Schaumburg-Lippe.
 Badeinsel Steinhude was built in 1974-75 using sand retrieved from the lake. It has a sandy beach which is popular during summer; a service centre is available. Access to the island is via an  pedestrian bridge from Steinhude.

Tourism
The lake is a popular destination for locals and for vacationists. Up to three ships offer cruises; they are supplemented by smaller boats running on schedule across the lake.

References

External links

Steinhuder Meer Nature Park
 

 
Ramsar sites in Germany
Lakes of Lower Saxony
LSteinhuderMeer